

Storms

Unnamed tropical cyclone near Cairns (1934) 
On March 12, 1934, a powerful cyclone crossed the coast of Far North Queensland at Cape Tribulation. A pearling fleet was decimated by the system, resulting in the loss of 75 lives. The towns of Daintree and Mossman suffered extensive damage, with damage to vegetation reported in Cairns.

Unnamed tropical cyclone near Broome (1935) 
This is Australia's second deadliest cyclone in the 20th century. The Lacepede Islands near Broome were struck sinking 21 pearling luggers with 141 lives lost.

Unnamed tropical cyclone near Roebourne (1939) 
Nine people died on 11 January 1939 with the loss of the Nicol Bay, on a holiday cruise to the Ashburton River. Some properties in Roebourne, Western Australia sustained damage.

See also
 1900–1940 South Pacific cyclone seasons
 1900–1950 South-West Indian Ocean cyclone seasons
Atlantic hurricane seasons: 1930, 1931, 1932, 1933, 1934, 1935, 1936, 1937, 1938, 1939
Eastern Pacific hurricane seasons: 1930, 1931, 1932, 1933, 1934, 1935, 1936, 1937, 1938, 1939
Western Pacific typhoon seasons: 1930, 1931, 1932, 1933, 1934, 1935, 1936, 1937, 1938, 1939
North Indian Ocean cyclone seasons: 1930, 1931, 1932, 1933, 1934, 1935, 1936, 1937, 1928, 1939

References 

1930s in Australia
Australian region cyclone seasons
 disasters in Oceania